In baseball, an intentional base on balls, usually referred to as an intentional walk and denoted in baseball scorekeeping by IBB, is a base on balls (walk) issued to a batter by a pitcher with the intent of removing the batter's opportunity to swing at the pitched ball. A pitch that is intentionally thrown far outside the strike zone for this purpose is referred to as an intentional ball. Since the  season, intentional bases on balls are issued to the hitter at the discretion of a manager.

Barry Bonds is the all-time leader in intentional bases on balls with 688 career intentional walks. Bonds is the only player to be intentionally walked more than 400 times. Albert Pujols is second all-time and the active leader with 315 career intentional bases on balls and the only other player to be intentionally walked over 300 times.

Key

List

Stats updated as of the end of the 2022 season.

Notes

References

External links

Major League Baseball statistics
Intentional bases on balls leaders